Richard Holland (fl. 1450) was a Scottish writer.

Richard Holland may also refer to:

Richard Holland (16th-century MP) (c. 1549–1618), Member of Parliament (MP) for Lancashire
Richard Holland (Parliamentarian) (died 1661), English politician
Richard J. Holland (1925– 2000), American politician in the Virginia Senate
Rick Holland (born 1978), English poet and artist